The 2011 Broxbourne Council election took place on 5 May 2011 to elect members of Broxbourne Borough Council in Hertfordshire, England. One third of the council was up for election.

This was the last election before boundary changes take place in 2012.

Accordingly, all newly elected members will have a 1-year term of office before an "all out" election for 30 members in 10 new wards in May 2012.

Composition of expiring seats before election

Election results

Results summary 

An election was held in all 13 wards on Thursday 5 May 2011 with the Conservative Party winning 12 of the 13 seats, making a gain in Cheshunt North Ward from an Independent.

This was the first Broxbourne Council Election where the English Democrats and United Kingdom Independence Party had fielded candidates.  All four of the English Democrat candidates at this election had previously stood for the British National Party in the 2010 Broxbourne Borough Election.  This was the first Broxbourne Borough Election since 2000 where the British National Party had failed to field any candidates.

The new political balance of the council following this election was:

Conservative 35 seats
Labour 3 seats

This was the final Broxbourne Council Election before boundary changes take place in 2012.  The boundary changes will reduce the number of wards from 13 to 10 and the number of Borough Councillors from 38 to 30.  The next Local Government Election is scheduled for Thursday 3 May 2012 when all 30 of the new seats will be contested

Shortly after the May 2011 election, Councillor Jason Brimson (elected May 2010) resigned from his Cheshunt Central Seat. At the subsequent by-election held on 30 June 2011, Councillor Tony Siracusa (Conservative) was elected leaving the political balance of the council unchanged.

In November 2011 Councillor Keith Bellamy (Rye Park Ward) was suspended by the Conservative Party.

As a result of this, the political balance of the Council changed to:

Conservative 34 seats
Labour 3 seats
 Unaligned 1 seat

Broxbourne Council Cabinet 2011 - 2012

Coinciding with this election was a move to a Leader & Cabinet system from the previously operated Committee system (Alternative Sec 31)

Ward results

References

External links
 Broxbourne Council

2011
2011 English local elections
2010s in Hertfordshire
May 2011 events in the United Kingdom